The following is a list of hospitals in Malta.

Public Hospitals

Open

Closed

Private Hospitals and Medical Clinics
DaVinci Hospital, B'Kara (private hospital) 
St. James Hospital Group, Malta, (Private hospital group) 
St Philip's Hospital - Defunct Private Hospital

Historical 
In 1625, Caterina Scappi founded the first hospital exclusively for women in Malta, known as La Casetta or Santa Maria della Scala, and later Santa Maria della Pietà. The hospital was eventually destroyed.

References

Further reading

Malta
Hospitals

Malta